Acomayo River (possibly from Quechua aqu sand, mayu river, "sand river")  is a river  in Peru located in the Cusco Region, Acomayo Province, in the districts Acomayo and Acos. It is a right tributary of the Apurímac River. The confluence is southeast of the town Acomayo.

References

Rivers of Peru
Rivers of Cusco Region